The CUCEI railway station is part of the Guadalajara light rail system in the Mexican state of Jalisco. The station gets its name from the University Center of Exact Sciences and Engineering (CUCEI), next to the university complex of the University of Guadalajara in the Olímpica Zone; it's the last of the Second Viaduct —from the east towards the centre of Guadalajara— and it's next to the southern connection ramp with the Subterranean Section.

This station is located over the Revolución Avenue, between the Calzada Olímpica and the Corregidora street (40th st.), which both surround the whole university complex of the Olímpica Zone.

The logotype of the station is the shield of the CUCEI, which is located on the southern side of the station.

Points of interest 
 Universitarian complex of the University of Guadalajara by Revolución Av: Polytechnic School (Escuela Politécnica) and Olympic Coliseum (Coliseo Olímpico)
 CECATI n°. 15 (Corregidora street)
 Preparatory school Nº. 12 and Vocational School of Guadalajara (Escuela Vocacional de Guadalajara) (Gral. Marcelino García Barragán Blvd.)
 Olympic pool (Alberca Olímpica) and Technological stadium (Estadio Tecnológico) (by Calzada Olímpica)
 University Center of Exact Sciences and Engineering (Calz. Olímpica corner with Gral. M.G.B. Blvd.)
 Physical culture and sports school from the University Center of  Health Sciences (CUCS)

References 

Guadalajara light rail system Line 3 stations
Railway stations in Guadalajara
Railway stations in Mexico at university and college campuses
Railway stations opened in 2020